The 2006–07 Ugandan Super League was the 40th season of the official Ugandan football championship, the top-level football league of Uganda.

Overview
The 2006–07 Uganda Super League was contested by 17 teams and was won by Uganda Revenue Authority SC, while Kanoni Mukono United FC, Mbale Heroes, City Lads and Masindi Town Council were relegated.

League standings

Leading goalscorer
The top goalscorer in the 2006–07 season was Hamis Kitagenda of Uganda Revenue Authority SC with 20 goals.

Footnotes

External links
 Uganda - List of Champions - RSSSF (Hans Schöggl)
 Ugandan Football League Tables - League321.com

Ugandan Super League seasons
1
Uganda Super League